Stibnite, sometimes called antimonite, is a sulfide mineral with the formula Sb2S3.  This soft grey material crystallizes in an orthorhombic space group.  It is the most important source for the metalloid antimony. The name is derived from the Greek στίβι stibi through the Latin stibium as the former name for the mineral and the element antimony.

Structure

Stibnite has a structure similar to that of arsenic trisulfide, As2S3.  The Sb(III) centers, which are pyramidal and three-coordinate, are linked via bent two-coordinate sulfide ions. However, some studies suggest that the actual coordination polyhedra of antimony are SbS7, with (3+4) coordination at the M1 site and (5+2) at the M2 site. Some of the secondary bonds impart cohesion and are connected with packing. Stibnite is grey when fresh, but can turn superficially black due to oxidation in air.

Properties 
The band gap is 1.88 eV at room temperature and it is a photoconductor.

Uses

Pastes of Sb2S3 powder in fat or in other materials have been used since ca. 3000 BC as eye cosmetics in the Mediterranean and farther afield; in this use, Sb2S3 is called kohl. It was used to darken the brows and lashes, or to draw a line around the perimeter of the eye.

Antimony trisulfide finds use in pyrotechnic compositions, namely in the glitter and fountain mixtures. Needle-like crystals, "Chinese Needle", are used in glitter compositions and white pyrotechnic stars. The "Dark Pyro" version is used in flash powders to increase their sensitivity and sharpen their report. It is also a component of modern safety matches. It was formerly used in flash compositions, but its use was abandoned due to toxicity and sensitivity to static electricity.

Stibnite was used ever since protodynastic Ancient Egypt as a medication and a cosmetic. The Sunan Abi Dawood reports, “prophet Muhammad said: 'Among the best types of collyrium is antimony (ithmid) for it clears the vision and makes the hair sprout.'”

The 17th century alchemist Eirenaeus Philalethes, also known as George Starkey, describes stibnite in his alchemical commentary An Exposition upon Sir George Ripley's Epistle. Starkey used stibnite as a precursor to philosophical mercury, which was itself a hypothetical precursor to the Philosopher's stone.

Occurrence
Stibnite occurs in hydrothermal deposits and is associated with realgar, orpiment, cinnabar, galena, pyrite, marcasite, arsenopyrite, cervantite, stibiconite, calcite, ankerite, barite and chalcedony.

Small deposits of stibnite are common, but large deposits are rare. It occurs in Canada, Mexico, Peru, Japan, China, Germany, Romania, Italy, France, England, Algeria, and Kalimantan, Borneo. In the United States it is found in Arkansas, Idaho, Nevada, California, and Alaska.

As of May 2007, the largest specimen on public display (1000 pounds) is at the American Museum of Natural History. The largest documented single crystals of stibnite measured ~60×5×5 cm and originated from different locations including Japan, France and Germany.

See also 
 List of minerals
 Stibnides, compounds of antimony

References

External links

 

Alchemical substances
Antimony minerals
Orthorhombic minerals
Minerals in space group 62
Pyrotechnic fuels
Sulfide minerals